"Smash It Up" is a song by English punk rock band the Damned, released as a single on 12 October 1979 by Chiswick Records. It is considered the band's unofficial anthem.

The single was the second release from the band's third studio Machine Gun Etiquette (1979), where it was listed as "Smash It Up (Part II)". The B-side of the single was "Burglar".

Production
"Smash It Up" was produced by the band and Roger Armstrong. It is structured in two-part form: a melodic instrumental introduction (written in hommage to Marc Bolan after his tragic death) segueing into an energetic pop-punk song. The song's lyrics criticize those who indulge in hippie culture (referring to "blow wave hairstyles" and "Glastonbury hippies") instead of advocating for political revolution.

Release
Chiswick reissued the single on their budget Big Beat imprint in February 1982. The single was also issued in Australia, Germany, the Netherlands and Spain.

"Smash It Up" was boycotted by BBC Radio 1 because of its perceived anarchic lyrics, stalling at No. 35 in the UK Singles Chart.

In November 2004, Ace Records reissued the single on CD, with alternate versions of the song (including the previously unreleased third and fourth parts of "Smash It Up") and a video, directed by Martin Baker, added.

Promotion
The Damned performed "Smash It Up" (as well as "I Just Can't Be Happy Today") on the BBC2 television show The Old Grey Whistle Test in 1979.

In other media
A cover version of the song by the Offspring appeared for a few seconds in the 1995 film Batman Forever. The full song was included on the film's soundtrack album.

The song appeared in the console-based game Driver: Parallel Lines (2006) as a track from the 1978 era.

The song appears in the 2010 film, It's Kind of a Funny Story.

The song also appears at the end credits of DC Universe's Titans, Season 2, Episode 10.

Track listing
All songs written by Scabies, Sensible, Vanian, Ward.

1979 vinyl release
"Smash It Up" – 2:52
"Burglar" – 3:33

2004 CD release
"Smash It Up" – 2:52
"Burglar" – 3:33
"Smash It Up Parts 1–4" – 8:43

Production credits
Producers
Roger Armstrong
The Damned

Musicians
 Dave Vanian − vocals
 Captain Sensible − guitar, keyboards
 Rat Scabies − drums, vocals on "Burglar"
 Algy Ward − bass

Cover versions

The song was covered by Die Toten Hosen for the 1991 cover album Learning English, Lesson One.

In 1995, The Offspring covered the song for the soundtrack to the film Batman Forever. The song peaked at No. 16 on the U.S. Modern Rock Tracks chart and No. 47 on the Hot 100 Airplay (Radio Songs) chart. It was later released on the Offspring's Club Me EP and also on the "All I Want" CD single.

References

External links

1979 singles
1982 singles
1995 singles
2004 singles
Batman music
Batman (1989 film series)
The Damned (band) songs
The Offspring songs
Songs written by Captain Sensible
Songs written by David Vanian
Songs written by Rat Scabies
Songs written by Algy Ward
1979 songs